Calochilus grandiflorus, commonly known as the giant beard orchid or golden beard orchid, is a species of orchid endemic to eastern Australia. It has a single leaf with a reddish base and up to fifteen relatively large golden bronze-coloured flowers with a red or coppery red "beard".

Description
The leaf is fully developed when the first flower opens. The lateral sepals are a similar length but narrower. The column has two purple coloured "eyes" but there is no ridge between the eyes. Flowering occurs from September to December.

Taxonomy
The giant beard orchid was first formally described in 1873 by George Bentham who gave it the name Calochilus campestris var. grandiflorus and published the description in Flora Australiensis. In 1915 Karel Domin raised the variety to species status.<ref name=APNI>{{cite web|title=Calochilus grandiflorus|url= https://id.biodiversity.org.au/instance/apni/525355|publisher=APNI|accessdate=28 June 2018}}</ref> The specific epithet (grandiflorus) is derived from the Latin words grandis meaning "large", "great", "noble", "sublime" or "magnificent" and flos meaning "flower".

Distribution and habitatCalochilus grandiflorus'' grows in near-coastal heath, sometimes on nearby mountains in New South Wales north from Bulahdelah and in southeastern Queensland.

References

grandiflorus
Endemic orchids of Australia
Orchids of New South Wales
Orchids of Queensland
Plants described in 1873